Barisal Metropolitan Police or BMP was established in 2006 based on Barishal city to serve the metropolis. It was established by an ordinance of The Barisal Metropolitan Police Ordinance - 2006. Saiful Islam is the commissioner of Barisal Metropolitan Police.

History 
Bangladesh Parliament passed Barisal Metropolitan Police Act in 2009 which allowed Barisal Metropolitan Police, it was founded in 2006.

Police clashes with students of Shahid Abdur Rab Serniabat Textile Engineering College who were on strike in June 2011.

In August 2013, Md Shamsuddin, Commissioner of Barisal Metropolitan Police, was appointed Commissioner of Khulna Metropolitan Police.

In December 2014, the police baton charged a rally of students from Barisal Health Technology Institute injuring 18-23 students. The police action was condemned by civil society and The Daily Star in an editorial.

In July 2015, the Deputy Commissioner of Barisal Metropolitan Police, Zillur Rahman, was suspended for creating a 7.7 million taka bribe fund for the promotion of 230 police officers. Another Deputy Commissioner, Shoyeb Ahmed, knew about the fund and was subsequently removed from the investigation into the fund. Commissioner Shoibal Kanti Chowdhury was removed over his involvement in the fund.

In January 2016, a halt on promotions and increments were placed on ten officers of Barisal Metropolitan Police accused of creating a collective fund for bribes for promotions. Officer in charge of Agoiljhara Police Station, Monirul Islam, had an altercation with a Swechchhasebak League activist. The Swechchhasebak League activist went to complain to the local member of parliament, Abul Hasnat Abdullah, and while leaving the residence of Abul Hasnat Abdullah he was assaulted by a police constable who was later suspended. In February, a sub inspector of Barisal Airport Police Station was suspended for extortion. Barisal Metropolitan Police in August ordered the closure of Peace School and College.

Police clashed with traders in February 2017 when they tried to stop an eviction drive of the Barisal City Corporation. In March a constable was suspended for taking selfies with the Ministry of Industries, Amir Hossain Amu, at the Barisal Women's College while on duty.

Eight officers of the Detective Branch unit of Barisal Metropolitan Police were suspended for assaulting a journalist of DBC News and then further torturing him in custody in March 2018. The also assaulted senior journalists who visited the police station to see the detained journalist.

Three police officers of Barisal Metropolitan Police were suspended for assaulting two journalists who went to cover a COVID-19 program where the Upazila Nirbahi Officer Moshareaf Hossain addressed in 2020.

Barisal Metropolitan Police provided oxygen during the COVID-19 pandemic in Bangladesh. In August 2021, the Barisal Metropolitan police baton charged Awami League activists and employees of Barishal City Corporation outside the office of the Upazila Nirbahi Officer. Munibur Rahman, Barisal Sadar Upazila Nirbahi Officer filed two cases against Mayor Serniabat Sadiq Abdullah and Awami League activists.

List of Commissioners

Police stations
Barisal Metropolitan Police consist of 8 police stations.
Kotwali Model Thana, Barisal
Airport Thana
Kawnia Thana
Bandar Thana, Barisal
Rupatali Thana
Barisal University Thana
Char Monai Thana
Kashipur Thana
University of Barisal camp

References

Barisal
Municipal law enforcement agencies of Bangladesh
2006 establishments in Bangladesh